Tarsus University is a public university in Turkey, Mersin. On 18 May 2018, it was established as a separate university in Tarsus district with the establishment of academic units affiliated to Mersin University and new academic units. Tarsus University provides education in 1 institute, 7 faculties and 3 vocational schools.

History 
The origins of Tarsus University date back to 1992 with its academic units affiliated with Mersin University. It was founded with the Law No. 7141 published in the Official Gazette of the Republic of Turkey numbered 30425 on 18 May 2018

Academics

Institutes 
 Institute of Graduate Studies

Faculties 

 Faculty of Aeronautics and Astronautics
 Faculty of Economics and Administrative Sciences
 Faculty of Humanities and Social Sciences
 Faculty of Engineering
 Faculty of Health Sciences
 Faculty of Technology
 Faculty of Applied Sciences

Vocational schools 

 Tarsus University Vocational School
 Tarsus University Vocational School of Health Services
 Tarsus OSB Technical Sciences Vocational School

References 

Universities and colleges in Turkey
Educational institutions established in 2018
Buildings and structures in Mersin
2018 establishments in Turkey